The 1986 Scottish League Cup Final was played on 26 October 1986, at Hampden Park in Glasgow and was the final of the 41st Scottish League Cup competition. The final was contested by Rangers and Celtic in an Old Firm derby.

Rangers won the match 2–1, thanks to goals from Davie Cooper and Ian Durrant. In the aftermath of Mo Johnston's dismissal, Tony Shepherd was shown a red card by referee David Syme, who thought he had been struck by Shepherd. The linesman on the bench side confirmed that in fact it was a coin thrown from the crowd that had hit him, and Shepherd's red card was immediately retracted, although the chaotic nature of the incident led to confused accounts in contemporary reports.

Match details

References

1986
League Cup Final
Scottish League Cup Final 1986
Scottish League Cup Final 1986
20th century in Glasgow
Old Firm matches
October 1986 sports events in the United Kingdom